Vigla ("watch, lookout") may refer to:

Places in Greece
 Vigla (ski resort), a ski resort near Florina
 Vigla, Arta, a village in Arta
 Vigla, Mount Athos, a settlement in Mount Athos
 Mikri Vigla, a small village on the island of Naxos
 Kaki Vigla, a small village on the island of Salamis
The highest peak of Mount Kerkis on the island of Samos

Other uses
 Vigla (tagma), a Byzantine cavalry unit

See also